The 20th National Film Awards, presented by Ministry of Information and Broadcasting, India to felicitate the best of Indian Cinema released in the year 1972.

With this year, new award category is introduced for the feature films made in Meitei language. This newly introduced category includes President's Silver Medal for Best Feature Film in Manipuri.

Juries 

Six different committees were formed based on the film making sectors in India, mainly based in Bombay, Calcutta and Madras along with the central committee for all India level. For 20th National Film Awards, central committee was headed by Romesh Thapar.

 Jury Members: Central
 Romesh Thapar (Chairperson)Thakazhi Sivasankara PillaiRita RaySheila VatsUsha BhagatGirish Karnad M. Yunus DehlviTeji BachchanPhanishwar Nath 'Renu'Shanta GandhiU. Visweswar RaoI. S. Johar Ardhendu Mukerjee
 Jury Members: Short Films
 S. K. Kooka (Chairperson)B. D. GargaPrasanta SanyalGerson Da CunhaAruna VasudevaBishamber KhannaRevati Saran SharmaDin Dayal
 Jury Regional: Bombay
 Ali Sardar Jafri (Chairperson)Mrinalini SarabhaiCharles CorreaBikram SinghBhupendra Shah Gopinath TalwalkarD. G. NadkarniKumud MehtaAdi MarzbanP. K. RavindranathB. K. AdarshAtma RamG. P. ShirkeKamleshwar
 Jury Regional: Calcutta
 Sombhu Mitra (Chairperson)Amina KarSuchitra MitraSanat LahiriN. K. GhoshBhaben BaruaRamesh Chandra DhallAnanda ShankarBadal SarkarB. N. Sircar
 Jury Regional: Calcutta - Nominated
 Parimal SarkarKanan DeviSubodh MitraElangbam Nilakanta SinghMaharaj Kumari Binodini Devi
 Jury Regional: Madras
 Malcolm Adiseshiah (Chairperson)B. N. ReddyA. L. VelliappaMahmooda Haja ShareefS. AnanthamurthyThoppil RaviV. C. SubburamanP. S. Ramakrishna RaoK. P. KottarakkaraRajammal AnantharamanP. C. Mathew

Awards 

Awards were divided into feature films and non-feature films.

President's Gold Medal for the All India Best Feature Film is now better known as National Film Award for Best Feature Film, whereas President's Gold Medal for the Best Documentary Film is analogous to today's National Film Award for Best Non-Feature Film. For children's films, Prime Minister's Gold Medal is now given as National Film Award for Best Children's Film. At the regional level, President's Silver Medal for Best Feature Film is now given as National Film Award for Best Feature Film in a particular language. Certificate of Merit in all the categories is discontinued over the years.

Lifetime Achievement Award

Feature films 

Feature films were awarded at All India as well as regional level. For 20th National Film Awards, a Malayalam film Swayamvaram won the President's Gold Medal for the All India Best Feature Film along with winning the maximum number of awards (four). Following were the awards given in each category:

All India Award 

Following were the awards given:

Regional Award 

The awards were given to the best films made in the regional languages of India. For feature films in English, Kashmiri, Oriya and Punjabi language, President's Silver Medal for Best Feature Film was not given. The producer and director of the film were awarded with 5,000 and a Silver medal, respectively.

Non-Feature films 

Following were the awards given:

Short films

Awards not given 

Following were the awards not given as no film was found to be suitable for the award:

 Best Story Writer
 Best Film on Family Welfare
 Best Children's Film
 Best Educational / Instructional Film
 Best Experimental Film
 Best Promotional Film (Non-Commercial)
 President's Silver Medal for Best Feature Film in English
 President's Silver Medal for Best Feature Film in Oriya
 President's Silver Medal for Best Feature Film in Punjabi

References

External links 
 National Film Awards Archives
 Official Page for Directorate of Film Festivals, India

National Film Awards (India) ceremonies
1972 film awards
1972 in Indian cinema